August Edgar Johansen (July 21, 1905 – April 16, 1995) was a politician from the U.S. state of Michigan.

Biography
Johansen was born in Philadelphia, Pennsylvania, and attended the public schools in Battle Creek, Michigan.  He attended Olivet College in 1922 and 1923, and Western Michigan College of Education in Kalamazoo in 1923 and 1924.  He graduated from the University of Chicago in 1926.

Johansen was a reporter with the Battle Creek Moon-Journal during the summers from 1922 to 1927.  He served as minister of the Seventh Day Baptist Church in Chicago, Illinois, and Congregational Church in Bedford, Michigan, from 1924 to 1934.  He was also manager of industrial relations of Kellogg Company in Battle Creek, from 1934 to 1944.  He was an editorial writer for the Battle Creek Enquirer-News from 1944 to 1948, editor of the Lakeview News, and news editor on radio from 1944 to 1951.  He was a member of the Calhoun County Tax Allocation Board in 1949 and 1950 and served as administrative assistant to U.S. Representative Paul W. Shafer from 1951 to 1954.

In 1954, after Shafer's death just two weeks after being nominated unopposed in the Republican Party primary election for Michigan's 3rd congressional district, Johansen was elected to replace Shafer in the 84th United States Congress. Johansen was subsequently re-elected to the next four Congresses, serving from January 3, 1955, to January 3, 1965. In 1964, Johansen lost in the general election to Democrat Paul H. Todd, Jr. Johansen voted against the Civil Rights Acts of 1957, 1960, and 1964, as well as the 24th Amendment to the U.S. Constitution. The Washington Post described him as one of the most consistent non-Southern opponents of civil rights legislation in his era.

Johansen later served as executive vice president of the Robert A. Taft Institute for Government from 1966 to 1967.  He was a lecturer and writer.  Johansen died in Orlando, Florida, of Alzheimer's disease.  He was buried at Glen Haven Memorial Park and Mausoleum in Winter Park, Florida.

References

Sources

August E. Johansen at The Political Graveyard

1905 births
1995 deaths
University of Chicago alumni
Republican Party members of the United States House of Representatives from Michigan
Deaths from dementia in Florida
Deaths from Alzheimer's disease
20th-century American politicians
Politicians from Philadelphia
American Protestants